The 1953–54 New York Knicks season was the eighth season for the team in the National Basketball Association (NBA). New York won its second straight regular season Eastern Division title with a 44–28 record, which placed them two games ahead of the Boston Celtics and Syracuse Nationals. The first round of the 1954 NBA Playoffs consisted of round-robin tournaments, where the top three teams in each division played each other in home and away matchups. The Knicks went 0–4 against the Celtics and Nationals, and did not qualify for the Eastern Division Finals.

NBA Draft

Note: This is not an extensive list; it only covers the first and second rounds, and any other players picked by the franchise that played at least one game in the league.

Regular season

Season standings

x – clinched playoff spot

Record vs. opponents

Game log

Playoffs

|- align="center" bgcolor="#ffcccc"
| 1
| March 16
| Boston
| L 71–93
| Carl Braun (18)
| —
| Simmons, Baechtold (3)
| Madison Square Garden III
| 0–1
|- align="center" bgcolor="#ffcccc" 
| 2
| March 18
| @ Syracuse
| L 68–75
| Harry Gallatin (15)
| Harry Gallatin (20)
| Jim Baechtold (5)
| Onondaga War Memorial
| 0–2
|- align="center" bgcolor="#ffcccc"
| 3
| March 20
| @ Boston
| L 78–79
| Harry Gallatin (15)
| —
| Braun, Simmons (3)
| Boston Garden
| 0–3
|- align="center" bgcolor="#ffcccc" 
| 4
| March 21
| Syracuse
| L 99–103
| Carl Braun (32)
| Nat Clifton (16)
| Carl Braun (6)
| Madison Square Garden III
| 0–4
|-

Awards and records
Harry Gallatin, All-NBA First Team
Carl Braun, All-NBA Second Team

References

External links
1953–54 New York Knickerbockers Statistics

New York Knicks seasons
New York Knicks season
New York Knicks
New York Knicks
1950s in Manhattan
Madison Square Garden